Ron Charles (born 1962 in St. Louis, Missouri) is a book critic at The Washington Post. His awards include the 2008 National Book Critics Circle Award Nona Balakian Citation for book reviews, and 1st Place for A&E Coverage from the Society for Features Journalism in 2011. He was one of three jurors for the 2014 Pulitzer Prize in Fiction.

Charles grew up in Town and Country, Missouri, and graduated from Principia College and Washington University in St. Louis before getting a job as a teacher at John Burroughs School. After a student's parent offhandedly suggested he try making a living as a book reviewer, Charles sent his first book review to The Christian Science Monitor, which eventually hired him. He spent seven years as the Monitors book review editor and staff critic. 

In 2005, he was hired by the Washington Post. Sometime after August 2010, with his review of Jonathan Franzen's Freedom, Charles began a series of video book reviews for Post called  "The Totally Hip Video Book Review". In the series, Charles, sometimes featuring his wife, high school English teacher Dawn Charles, hams it up with sight gags and intentionally bad jokes. It is a satirical look at current books in the news and the art of book reviewing.

See also
Michael Dirda
Jonathan Yardley

Notes

External links
Ron Charles, articles at The Washington Post
"Totally Hip Video Book Reviewer", videos at The Washington Post
Ron Charles, at Twitter
Interview with Ron Charles, by Bookslut, 10/2009

1962 births
American literary critics
Living people
Writers from St. Louis
The Washington Post journalists
Journalists from Missouri
The Christian Science Monitor people
PEN/Faulkner Award for Fiction winners
Principia College alumni
Washington University in St. Louis alumni